Admiral Baldwin may refer to:

Charles H. Baldwin (admiral) (1822–1888), U.S. Navy rear admiral
Frank Baldwin (admiral) (1880–1959), U.S. Navy rear admiral
John A. Baldwin Jr. (born 1933), U.S. Navy vice admiral
Robert B. Baldwin (1923–2017), U.S. Navy vice admiral